Chumash Peak is a  mountain in San Luis Obispo County, California. It is just northwest of San Luis Obispo, on the south side of California State Route 1.

The peak is one of the volcanic plugs known as the Nine Sisters, between Cerro Romauldo to its east and Bishop Peak to its west.

In 1964 the hill was named in recognition of the Chumash Indians who lived in the area due to efforts by Louisiana Dart, curator of the San Luis Obispo County Museum.
Access to the peak is currently unavailable.

The peak was quarried in the 1970s for foundation material in the construction of new buildings on the Cuesta College campus nearby.

References

External links
 

Nine Sisters
Mountains of San Luis Obispo County, California
Volcanic plugs of California
Mountains of Southern California